The Ramsar Convention on Wetlands of International Importance Especially as Waterfowl Habitat is an international treaty for the conservation and sustainable use of wetlands. Adopted in 1971, it entered into force in 1975 and as of May 2022 had 172 contracting parties.

Ramsar sites

See also
 Ramsar Convention
 List of Ramsar sites worldwide
 List of national parks of Greece
 List of birds of Greece

References

External links

 Ramsar - Greece

 
Protected areas of Greece
Environment of Greece
Greece